Oliver Collins (born 1972) is a former hurler from Northern Ireland, who played as a midfielder at senior level for the Derry county team.  

Collins joined the panel during the 1989-90 National League and subsequently became a regular member of the starting fifteen until his retirement after the 2003 championship. During that time he won two Ulster winners' medals.

At club level Collins is a nine-time county club championship medalist with Lavey.

References

1972 births
Living people
Derry inter-county hurlers
Lavey hurlers
Ulster inter-provincial hurlers